Frank Ackerman Hill (March 20, 1919 – January 5, 2012) was an American veteran and WWII Fighter Ace who served in the U.S. Army Air Forces and the U.S. Air Force.

Early life and education 
Hill was born in Nyack, New York, to parents Frederick L. Hill and Ruth (née Ackerman) Hill and raised in Westwood and Hillsdale, New Jersey.

With members of his high school flying club, Hill took part in purchasing, restoring and flying a vintage Cessna glider. He graduated high school in 1937 and took an aircraft mechanic course. In September 1939, Hill enlisted in aerial photography school at Chanute Field, Illinois. After passing a  two-year college equivalency exam, it qualified him for flight school. He joined Class Flight 40-G as a flying cadet, graduating from Kelley Field, Texas in November 1940.

Career 
He flew 166 combat missions during World War II, fighting in France, North Africa, Sicily, and Italy, flying British Spitfires. He became first ace of the USAAF 309th Fighter Squadron of the 31st Fighter Group in 1943, and then became the group's commander. He is credited with destroying seven enemy aircraft in aerial combat plus one more probable and five damaged.

During his 30-year career he served as the senior air instructor for the New York Air National Guard, served as director of operations at Air Defense Command in Colorado, and was commander of the 33rd Air Division in Virginia.

On Nov. 24, 1943, upon Hill's return home from war, the town of Hillsdale turned out to honor the then-24-year-old with a hero's welcome. After Hill retired in 1969 at the rank of colonel, he ran a real estate brokerage.

Awards 
Hill was inducted in 1992 into the New Jersey Aviation Hall of Fame.

He was posthumously awarded a Congressional Gold Medal in 2015.

The Frank A. Hill Causeway at the Woodcliff Lake Reservoir in New Jersey was dedicated July 21, 2017. The dedication was a joint effort by Suez Water and the Borough of Hillsdale, NJ.

Hill was awarded the Silver Star, the Distinguished Flying Cross, the Air Medal with 19 Oak Leaf Clusters, the Legion of Merit with two Oak Leaf Clusters, and five Air Force Commendation Medals.

Personal life 
Hill married Linda Lemke and the couple had three children. Hill died at age 92 in January 2012 in Birnamwood, Wisconsin, where he lived with his wife.

References

External links 
 Obituary northjersey.com
 Obituary legacy.com

1919 births
2012 deaths
United States Army Air Forces personnel of World War II
Recipients of the Air Medal
Recipients of the Silver Star
Recipients of the Distinguished Flying Cross (United States)
Recipients of the Legion of Merit
United States Army Air Forces officers
United States Air Force colonels
United States Army Air Forces pilots of World War II
Military personnel from New York (state)
Military personnel from New Jersey